Adam Žampa (born 13 September 1990) is a Slovakian World Cup alpine ski racer. His best result so far is the 5th place in combined at the 2014 Winter Olympics. His brother is Andreas Žampa.

Results

Winter Olympics
Source:  

Žampa appeared at the Olympic Games for the first time in 2014. In his first Olympics, in combined, Žampa just missed a medal by 0.67 seconds and finished 5th, after finishing 21st (or 27th) in downhill ride and winning the slalom ride of the competition.

FIS Alpine World Ski Championships
Source:

World Cup
Source:

World cup top 20 results
 0 wins
 0 podiums

References

External links
FIS Personal Profile

1990 births
Living people
Slovak male alpine skiers
Alpine skiers at the 2014 Winter Olympics
Alpine skiers at the 2018 Winter Olympics
Alpine skiers at the 2022 Winter Olympics
Olympic alpine skiers of Slovakia
Universiade medalists in alpine skiing
People from Kežmarok
Sportspeople from the Prešov Region
Universiade silver medalists for Slovakia
Competitors at the 2013 Winter Universiade